Troy E. Black (born 1968/1969) is a United States Marine and the 19th and current Sergeant Major of the Marine Corps as of July 26, 2019.

Early life
Black is a native of Louisville, Kentucky and a 1987 graduate of Jeffersontown High School.

Military career
Black entered U.S. Marine recruit training at Marine Corps Recruit Depot Parris Island in April 1988, graduating in July 1988. In October 1988, he graduated from the United States Marine Corps School of Infantry at Camp Geiger in North Carolina and received the military occupational specialty of 0331-Machine Gunner.

In December 1988, Black graduated the Marine Security Force School and was posted to the Marine Detachment aboard the  that deployed in 1989 in support of Operation Just Cause and to the Mediterranean. From September 1990 to 1993 he was posted to the 3rd Battalion, 5th Marines, serving in successive capacities of gunner, team leader, section leader, platoon sergeant, and platoon commander. In December 1990, Black deployed with the 3rd Battalion, 5th Marines to Kuwait in support of Operation Desert Shield and later Operation Desert Storm. In 1993, he completed the U.S. Army Basic Airborne Course at the U.S. Army Airborne School.

Between 1994 and 1997, Black served at Marine Corps Recruit Depot Parris Island as a drill instructor and then a senior drill instructor. From 1997 to 2000, he was assigned to a Fleet Anti-Terrorism Security Team, serving as a platoon sergeant, operations chief, and then a platoon commander. In 2000, Black returned to Marine Corps Recruit Depot Parris Island, where over the next three years he served as a senior drill instructor, Drill Instructor School instructor, and Recruit Training Regiment drill master.

Between 2003 and 2006, he served in the 2nd Battalion, 1st Marines as a company gunnery sergeant and then as a first sergeant, deploying twice to Iraq as part of Operation Iraqi Freedom. Between 2006 and 2007, Black served as a company first sergeant in the 3rd Assault Amphibian Battalion. From 2007 to 2009, he served as a sergeant major at Officer Candidates School. Black served as the sergeant major of the 3rd Battalion, 7th Marines from 2009 to 2011, deploying twice to Afghanistan as part of Operation Enduring Freedom.

In 2010, he was awarded the Bronze Star Medal with Combat "V" for running through uncleared territory to rescue a fallen comrade hit by an improvised explosive device. From 2011 to 2013, Black served as the sergeant major of Combat Logistics Battalion 5. He served as the sergeant major of the 11th Marine Expeditionary Unit from 2013 to 2015. Following that, Black served as the sergeant major of the 1st Marine Logistics Group from 2015 to 2017. He was named Sergeant Major of Manpower and Reserve Affairs in 2017. On April 25, 2019, Black was named the 19th Sergeant Major of the Marine Corps and assumed the post on July 26, 2019.

Awards and decorations

 8 service stripes.

References

United States Marine Corps personnel of the Gulf War
United States Marine Corps personnel of the Iraq War
United States Marine Corps personnel of the War in Afghanistan (2001–2021)
Living people
Military personnel from Louisville, Kentucky
Recipients of the Legion of Merit
Sergeants Major of the Marine Corps
Date of birth missing (living people)
1960s births